The 2017 Women's Super League was the inaugural season of the top level rugby league competition for women in England.  Run by the Rugby Football League there were four teams in the league; three (Bradford, Castleford and Featherstone) associated with professional clubs in West Yorkshire and one (Thatto Heath) associated with a leading amateur club in Lancashire.

The league was won by Bradford Bulls who went undefeated in the six round regular season before defeating Featherstone Rovers 36–6 in the Grand Final.

Results
The season comprised six rounds during which each team played the others home and away. The team finishing top of the league automatically qualified for the Grand Final. The teams finishing second and third playing a preliminary final to determine who the other grand finalists were.

Round 1: 23 July 2017
Castleford 48 – 14 Featherstone
Thatto Heath 26 – 32 Bradford

Round 2: 13 August 2017
 Featherstone 20 – 30 Thatto Heath
 Bradford 72 – 18 Castleford

Round 3: 20 August 2017
 Thatto Heath 64 – 4 Castleford
 Featherstone 0 – 24 Bradford

Round 4: 3 September 2017
 Featherstone 48 – 20 Castleford
 Bradford 40 – 10 Thatto Heath

Round 5: 10 September 2017
 Thatto Heath 14 – 24 Featherstone
 Castleford 12 – 60 Bradford

Round 6: 24 September 2017
 Castleford 4 – 38 Thatto Heath
 Bradford 27 – 10 Featherstone

Preliminary Final: 1 October 2017
Thatto Heath 20 – 21 Featherstone

Grand Final: 7 October 2017
Bradford 36 – 6 Featherstone

Table

References

RFL Women's Super League
2017 in English rugby league
2017 in English women's sport
2017 in women's rugby league